Jackline Chepkoech (born 3 October 2003) is a Kenyan athlete who specializes in the 3000 metres steeplechase. At the age of 18, she won the gold medal at the 2022 Commonwealth Games in Birmingham, setting the Games record in the process.

Chepkoech was the 2021 World Under-20 champion.

Achievements

Circuit wins, and National championships
 Diamond League
 2022 (3000 m st.): Brussels Memorial Van Damme
 Kenyan Athletics Championships
 3000 m steeplechase: 2022

References

External links

2003 births
Living people
Kenyan female steeplechase runners
World Athletics U20 Championships winners
Commonwealth Games gold medallists for Kenya
Commonwealth Games medallists in athletics
Athletes (track and field) at the 2022 Commonwealth Games
Medallists at the 2022 Commonwealth Games